Daniel Keith "Danny" Earls (born 22 April 1989) is an Irish footballer and artist. Earls was scouted and signed as a teenager by English Premier League side Aston Villa and played youth football for the Republic of Ireland. He went on to have a nine-year professional career in the United States of America with Rochester Rhinos, Colorado Rapids and Pittsburgh Riverhounds. As of 2019, he is unattached, and focusing on becoming a professional comic book artist.

Career

Europe
Born in Wicklow, Earls played for Wicklow Rovers A.F.C. and St. Josephs Boys A.F.C. in his native Ireland, before moving to English Premier League club Aston Villa in 2005. Earls never played a senior first team game for Villa, but played extensively for the reserves and captained the team until leaving in 2008.

United States
In June 2008 Earls left England for the United States when he signed with Rochester Rhinos of the USL First Division. He made his debut with the team in the Rhinos' 2–1 victory over RWB Adria in the 2008 Lamar Hunt U.S. Open Cup on 10 June 2008. On 29 July 2008, he was selected as the USL-1 Player of the Week.

Earls played 53 games with the Rochester Rhinos in two seasons, before signing with Major League Soccer side Colorado Rapids on 10 February 2010. After one season with Colorado in which he made 18 appearances and won MLS Cup, Earls was traded to Seattle Sounders FC, along with teammate Julien Baudet, on 22 November 2010.
Earls was waived by Seattle on 1 March 2011. He subsequently resumed training with Colorado and re-signed with the Rapids on 30 March 2011. Colorado confirmed on 17 January 2012 that Earls would not return for the 2012 season after appearing in four matches for the Rapids during the 2011 season.

On 3 April 2012, Rochester Rhinos announced that the club re-signed Earls to a one-year deal. Following the 2013 season, Earls was named the Rhinos' team MVP.

Prior to the 2014 season, Earls signed with the Pittsburgh Riverhounds, also of the USL Pro. In his first season with the club, Earls appeared in and started 27 matches, tallying 1 goal and 6 assists. He finished the 2015 season with 3 goals and 3 assists in 25 league appearances.

On 3 June 2016 it was announced that the Riverhounds had resigned Earls for the remainder of the 2016 season. On 30 November 2017, Pittsburgh announced that Earls' contract had expired, ending his four-year spell with the club.

Having returned to his home town of Wicklow in 2018, Earls focused on his artwork and was commissioned by the Football Association of Ireland to produce programme covers for John O'Shea's testimonial match and an international friendly between the Republic of Ireland and Northern Ireland.

Honours

Colorado Rapids
 Major League Soccer Eastern Conference Championship: 2010
 Major League Soccer MLS Cup: 2010

References

External links

1989 births
Living people
Republic of Ireland association footballers
Republic of Ireland expatriate association footballers
Expatriate soccer players in the United States
USL First Division players
Major League Soccer players
USL Championship players
Association footballers from County Wicklow
Aston Villa F.C. players
Rochester New York FC players
Colorado Rapids players
Pittsburgh Riverhounds SC players
Association football defenders